Sergei Anshakov (born January 13, 1984) is a Russian ice hockey left wing who is currently an unrestricted free agent. Anshakov was drafted by the Los Angeles Kings in the 2002 NHL Entry Draft. He began playing in the Russian Super League in 2002 with CSKA Moscow. In 2003, Anshakov was dealt with Martin Strbak to the Penguins for Martin Straka.

On June 7, 2010 Anshakov was transferred from CSKA Moscow to Molot-Prikamie Perm of the Vysshaya Hokkeinaya Liga. He played ten regular season games with the team, scoring two goals and two assists. Anshakov also scored two goals in three post-season appearances during the 2010-11 VHL season.

Anshakov is still an unrestricted free agent despite not playing in the 2011–12 season.

Career statistics

Regular season and playoffs

International

External links
 

1984 births
Living people
Amur Khabarovsk players
HC CSKA Moscow players
HC Dynamo Moscow players
HC MVD players
HC Neftekhimik Nizhnekamsk players
HC Sibir Novosibirsk players
Los Angeles Kings draft picks
Molot-Prikamye Perm players
Russian ice hockey left wingers
Salavat Yulaev Ufa players